There are two versions of The Price Is Right in the Philippines, aired on two networks. The first version aired every Sunday on ABC (now TV5) from November 25, 2001 to December 8, 2002, and was hosted by Dawn Zulueta, with voice over provided off screen by Jefferson Utanes and later Michael Knight. The second version, hosted by Kris Aquino on ABS-CBN, It premiered on February 14, 2011, replacing Shoutout!. The show concluded on August 13, 2011. It was replaced by Junior MasterChef Pinoy Edition in its timeslot. Voice over is provided by "Rich," composed of the identically-named The Amazing Race Asia 4 winners Richard Hardin and Richard Herrera; at one point, due to a prior commitment by the Richards, ABS-CBN reporter Marc Logan, known for his tongue-in-cheek reporting and comedic voice overs, filled in for the duo.

Overview
The two versions are nearly identical to the template set by the original US series (i.e. One Bid (P1,000 for perfect bid), pricing games, two Showcase Showdowns, and a Showcase round) with some exceptions. Both versions also use models of both genders, as the hosts of the two versions are female.

The ABC version featured six contestants, three competing in each of the two Showcase Showdowns. The winners of each Showcase Showdown competed in the Showcase portion. Initially, the Australian format (1981 onwards) was used, involving the alternate guessing of the price of the showcase and the winner rearranging the Showcase items in correct order from cheapest to the most expensive. The more familiar American format was used later in the ABC version's run. This version aired only on Sundays.

The ABS-CBN version initially involved only four contestants, two competing in each of the two Showcase Showdowns. The winners of those two Showdowns then competed in a third, one-spin-only Showdown to determine who competed in the Showcase round.

Later, the show involved only three contestants competing in one Showdown to determine who played in the Showcase round. In addition, each contestant was partnered with two other players who won money if the main contestant won a pricing game. Initially airing on weekdays, it was moved to Saturdays due to its low ratings.

The ABS-CBN version also used the US version's music package for its run (alongside a few original music cues), whereas the ABC version used original music.  (The ABS-CBN also used the theme from the British version with Joe Pasquale, which played as the wheel spun during the Showcase Showdown.)

List of pricing games used in the Philippine versions

ABC version
Any Number
Balance Game
Cliff Hangers
Clock Game
Cover Up
Danger Price
Double Prices
Easy as 123
Hi Lo
Hole In One
Joker
Let 'Em Roll
Money Game
Most Expensive
One Right Price
Pick-A-Number
Pick-A-Pair
Plinko
Push Over
Secret X
Shell Game
Squeeze Play
Shopping Spree
That's Too Much!

ABS-CBN version
Double Prices
Easy as 1 2 3
Five Price Tags
Golden Road
Hi Lo
Hole In One
It's In the Bag
Let 'Em Roll
One Right Price
One Wrong Price
Punch-A-Bunch
Race Game 
Secret X
Take Two

See also
 List of programs aired by TV5 (Philippine TV network)
 List of programs broadcast by ABS-CBN

References

2001 Philippine television series debuts
2002 Philippine television series endings
2011 Philippine television series debuts
2011 Philippine television series endings
ABS-CBN original programming
Philippine game shows
Philippine television series based on American television series
Television series by Fremantle (company)
TV5 (Philippine TV network) original programming
Filipino-language television shows